Doctor Demonicus (Douglas Birely) is a supervillain appearing in American comic books published by Marvel Comics. He possesses advanced knowledge of genetic engineering and has clashed with the Avengers and the Shogun Warriors, in addition to S.H.I.E.L.D.

Publication history

Doctor Demonicus first appeared in Godzilla, King of the Monsters (vol. 1) #4 (Nov. 1977) and was created by Doug Moench and Tom Sutton.

Fictional character biography
Douglas Birely was born in Culver City, California. As a scientist, he was studying the correlation between radioactivity and mutation when he is contaminated by a radioactive spill. As Doctor Demonicus, he is a criminal geneticist and subversive. His discovery of the Lifestone allows him to create immense monsters mutated from animals. These include Batragon, Ghilaron, Lepirax, and Centipor. Using his monsters and his Demon-Soldiers, he raids oil tankers from his secret laboratory located on one of the Aleutian Islands. The monsters are defeated by Godzilla and Demonicus is defeated by Gabe Jones and taken into S.H.I.E.L.D. custody. When Jones confronts Demonicus during this story, Demonicus is altogether willing to tell him his background and when referencing his monsters' creations he says "Knowing of his nuclear radiation mutation, I took my cues from Godzilla himself". When Godzilla begins slaying the creatures he has made, Demonicus becomes unstable, even claiming he would battle Godzilla directly in order to save one of the creatures.

Demonicus becomes an ally of the alien Myndai, Maur-Konn, who gives Demonicus his gigantic space satellite base orbiting the moon. Demonicus later uses his genetic and robotic monsters the Starchild, Cerberus, and the Hand of Five against the Shogun Warriors Raydeen, Combatra, and Dangard Ace. Demonicus launches a meteor strike against Earth from his space station base on the dark side of the Moon. He is defeated by the Shogun Warriors and taken into custody by S.H.I.E.L.D. again.

He eventually captures, mentally controls and further mutates Godzilla (however, the creature is deliberately not named as such, because Marvel's license to use the monster had, by that point, expired. To give readers a clue as to who the creature was, Demonicus refers to the creature as being both "the greatest living dinosaur" and "my once-greatest enemy", the latter referring to Godzilla's defeat of his original creations. This version of Godzilla, according to G-Fan magazine, still makes occasional appearances in the Marvel Universe). The creature also, for unknown reasons, shrunk in size once Demonicus had captured and enslaved him. He sets Godzilla against the Avengers West Coast. Demonicus also salvages Iron Man's original armor and uses it to attack the West Coast Avengers personally. He is defeated by Tony Stark. He is later mutated by both the Lifestone and the demon Raksasa. His alter ego, Douglas Birely, develops skin cancer, which is kept under control by devices in his costume.  

Demonicus is the founder, creator, and leader of the Pacific Overlords (who gained their various superpowers due to Demonicus exposing them to fragments of the Lifestone), and with them battles Sunfire and the West Coast Avengers. He raises a land mass from the Pacific Ocean floor just north of Hawaii, and on it founds the new nation of Demonica with himself as ruler. He attempts, unsuccessfully, to get the United Nations to recognize Demonica as a sovereign nation.  However, he is seemingly killed when Demonica sinks back into the Pacific.

Doctor Demonicus is eventually arrested, tried, convicted, and incarcerated for his crimes. He was sentenced to "the Raft", a supervillain prison facility. He was among the 43 villains who escaped during the breakout engineered by Electro.

The Hood hires him as part of his criminal organization to take advantage of the split in the superhero community caused by the Superhuman Registration Act. He helps them fight the New Avengers, but is taken down by Doctor Strange. Demonicus participates in the Hood's temporary alliance with superheroes in order to battle an invading Skrull force. As seen in flashbacks, the Hood had used his powers to help Demonicus and the others escape from jail. During a secretive gathering, Demonicus and the others learn of the Skrulls' attempt to infiltrate and control their organization. He joins with the Hood's gang in an attack on the New Avengers, who were expecting the Dark Avengers instead.

Powers and abilities
Doctor Demonicus is a genius with a Ph.D. in genetics and has an advanced knowledge of genetics and of the advanced technology of the alien Myndai. The doctor wears a costume that contains life-support devices which keep his skin cancer in remission. He has demonic-looking features, including mottled skin and horns on his forehead. He carries a blaster that fires an unknown form of concussive energy. He uses advanced genetics, robotics, and force field technology adapted to various weaponry. Doctor Demonicus possesses the Lifestone, a radioactive meteor, with which he has created artificially mutated monsters and humans.

References

External links
 Doctor Demonicus at Marvel Wiki
 Doctor Demonicus at Comic Vine
 
 Doctor Demonicus at Marvel Directory.com

Characters created by Doug Moench
Comics characters introduced in 1977
Fictional characters from Los Angeles County, California
Fictional characters with cancer
Fictional geneticists
Fictional mechanical engineers
Fictional roboticists
Marvel Comics male supervillains
Marvel Comics scientists